Peligro is the fourth studio album from Mexican Latin pop group Reik, released on July 5, 2011 through Sony Music Latin. According to the band, the album has a more aggressive, experimental and electronic sound than their previous productions.

Background
For this album the members of the pop trio wanted to venture into more adventurous sonic terrain, which not only targeted at a remote location in Tornillo (Texas), but also recruited several producers to find that new sound they sought in their new songs. Rey Palacios (Julieta Venegas, Belanova, Andrés Calamaro), Kiko Cibrián (Luis Miguel, Rocío Dúrcal) and Ettore Grenci (Yuridia, Kalimba Marichal) were selected to make the new delivery from the band, a little more classical, without losing that romantic touch to their well-known romantic ballads.

"The first single "Peligro" is the most experimental song on the album. Acoustic instruments still exist and there are also ballads. We remain being ourselves, but we decided to just make things a little more danceable. It's good to have songs that put people in a good mood," said member Bibi, at a press conference held upon the album's release.

Julio recalls that he and his friends traveled to Argentina, Los Angeles and New Jersey to find the place from which to create their new songs, but it was the tranquility in Tornillo, Texas which led them to choose the location as their site for work.

"We wanted to live that experience. We were in a residential studio, I think is the biggest in the world. We had different schedules, but most importantly, we achieved that communion as a group we were looking for," said the guitarist.

Reik returned to work with Mexican musician and producer Rey Palacios, who had participated in the group's third album, Un Día Más (2008).

Being a figure of great presence in the Mexican music scene, producer Rey Palacios, was able to summon the help of Ale Sergi (Miranda!) to co-write the tracks "Igual a nada" and "Cálido y rojo" with him.

Regarding the first promotional video, "Peligro", directed by TV producer Pedro Torres, Reik clarified that the "steamy" scenes in the video were not there to offend anyone. For this clip, the trio worked with sensual Venezuelan model Eglantina Zingg. "Eglantina is our friend of two years. I was stubborn with the idea that she'd get the part, although there were suggestions that a Brazilian model would work in her place. It was a little complicated because Eglantina was in Caracas, but in the end, were able to coordinate and everything turned out wonderfully," concluded Jesús.

Track listing

Charts

Weekly charts

Year-end charts

Album certification

References

2011 albums
Albums produced by Cachorro López
Reik albums
Sony Music Latin albums